Adja Sanou Paye (born 26 September 1989) is a Senegalese handball player for Le Pouzin Handball 07 and the Senegalese national team. 

She competed at the 2019 World Women's Handball Championship in Japan.

References

1989 births
Living people
Senegalese female handball players
20th-century Senegalese women
21st-century Senegalese women